"Stay This Way" is a song recorded by South Korean girl group Fromis 9 for their fifth extended play From Our Memento Box. It was released as the EP's lead single by Pledis Entertainment on June 27, 2022.

Background and release
On June 6, 2022, Pledis Entertainment announced Fromis 9 would be releasing their fifth extended play titled From Our Memento Box, it was also announced that member Baek Ji-heon would be returning from her hiatus. On June 9, the track listing was released with "Stay This Way" announced as the lead single. On June 21, the highlight medley teaser video was released. Four days later, the music video teaser was released.

Composition
"Stay This Way" was written by Seo Ji-eum, composed and arranged by Justin Reinstein and Lee Woo-min "collapsedone" alongside Anna Timgren for the composition. The song was described a funk bass song with lyrics about "going on an impromptu trip at sunset". "Stay This Way" was composed in the key of B major, with a tempo of 124 beats per minute.

Commercial performance
"Stay This Way" debuted at number 14 on South Korea's Circle Digital Chart in the chart issue dated June 26 – July 2, 2022; on its component charts, the song debuted at number one on the Circle Download Chart, number 143 on the Circle Streaming Chart, and number 16 on the Circle BGM Chart.

Promotion
On June 26, 2022, Pledis Entertainment announced the showcase for From Our Memento Box scheduled for June 27 would be cancelled after members Song Ha-young, Park Ji-won, Lee Seo-yeon, Lee Chae-young, and Baek Ji-heon got into a car accident. During the first week of promotions, the group performed on three music programs: Mnet's M Countdown on June 30, KBS2's Music Bank on July 1, and SBS's Inkigayo on July 3. In the second week, they performed on four music programs: SBS M's The Show on July 5, MBC M's Show Champion on July 6, M Countdown on July 7, and Music Bank on July 8, where they won first place for all four appearances.

Charts

Weekly charts

Monthly charts

Accolades

Release history

See also
 List of M Countdown Chart winners (2022)
 List of Music Bank Chart winners (2022)
 List of Show Champion Chart winners (2022)
 List of Show! Music Core Chart winners (2022)
 List of The Show Chart winners (2022)

References

2022 songs
2022 singles
Korean-language songs
Hybe Corporation singles